Francis Philip Francis (15 September 1852 – 18 January 1926) was an English cricketer.  Francis was a right-handed batsman who fielded as a wicket-keeper.  He was born in Upminster, Essex.

Francis made a single first-class appearance for Middlesex in 1881 against Surrey at Lord's. In his only first-class match he wasn't required to bat or bowl. He also played a number of matches for Essex before they were granted first-class status.

He died in Claygate, Surrey on 18 January 1926.

References

External links
Francis Francis at ESPNcricinfo
Francis Francis at CricketArchive

1852 births
1926 deaths
People from Upminster
Sportspeople from Essex
English cricketers
Middlesex cricketers